"WUPHF.com" is the ninth episode of the seventh season of the American comedy television series The Office, and the 135th episode overall. Written by Aaron Shure and directed by Danny Leiner, the episode originally aired on NBC in the United States on November 18, 2010.

The series depicts the everyday lives of office employees at the Scranton, Pennsylvania branch of the fictitious Dunder Mufflin Paper Company. In the episode, Ryan Howard (B. J. Novak) and Michael Scott (Steve Carell) struggle to convince coworkers who have invested in Ryan's startup company that he can make it profitable. Meanwhile, Dwight Schrute (Rainn Wilson) that hosts a hay festival in the parking lot of the building, distracting him from fulfilling a contract to Angela Martin (Angela Kinsey) to have sex. The episode received positive reviews and was nominated for the Writers Guild of America Award for Television: Episodic Comedy.

Synopsis
Ryan Howard (B. J. Novak) has convinced Michael Scott (Steve Carell), Darryl Philbin (Craig Robinson), Stanley Hudson (Leslie David Baker), Andy Bernard (Ed Helms), and Pam Halpert (Jenna Fischer) to invest in his startup business, a cross-portal messaging system housed at WUPHF.com. While Ryan touts a planned "investors ski weekend", Michael learns that there is already an offer to buy out WUPHF.com, but also that Ryan only has nine days of funding left before his venture collapses. Ryan's subsequent sales pitch falls apart when he reveals that the potential buyer is the Washington University Public Health Fund, who are only interested in the URL because it contains their initials, WUPHF. While the others demand that Ryan sell the company, Michael defends him, and because Michael is the majority shareholder in the company, his decision stands.

Pam privately tells Michael that Ryan has never viewed Michael as a best friend, and is merely taking advantage of Michael's affection and loyalty for him. Pam reminds Michael that other people have money at stake, and they will all lose money if he and Ryan do not sell the company. Michael is later upset by Ryan when he refuses to have dinner with him, and again when Ryan supports Michael's theoretical plan to get a second mortgage to fund WUPHF.com. While Michael refuses to sell the company, he pressures Ryan to save everyone's money and find a suitable course of action. Ryan, unable to make WUPHF.com profitable, decides to sell the company, to Michael's relief.

Meanwhile, Dwight Schrute (Rainn Wilson) hosts a hay festival in the parking lot for the Thanksgiving holiday, distracting him from a contractual obligation to have sex with Angela Martin (Angela Kinsey) at her request. A frustrated Angela meets a charming, friendly man (Jack Coleman) who is attending the festival with his young son (Griffin Gluck). Angela discovers that he is a widower, and approves when he asks if he can call her sometime. Dwight appoints himself the "Hay Festival King" in the meantime, revealing that the entire purpose of the festival was to exorcise memories from his childhood, where his family would host similar hay festivals and he never was elected king for them. He arrives at his and Angela's warehouse rendezvous point to see their procreation contract has been stamped VOID, and looks stricken.

Jim Halpert (John Krasinski) is in the midst of a record sales streak, but Angela informs Jim that Sabre instituted a commissions cap for the year and Jim maxed out his returns. Jim talks to Gabe Lewis (Zach Woods) about it, but Gabe insists that he cannot change the policy. Unmotivated to work, Jim struggles to entertain himself.

Production

"WUPHF.com" was written by co-executive producer Aaron Shure, his fifth writing credit on the series, and directed by Danny Leiner, his first Office directing credit. In a deleted scene, Michael seeks advice from Toby while the HR representative is having a webchat with his daughter; when Michael overhears Sasha talking about Toby's ex-wife's new boyfriend, Michael forgets he wanted help dealing with Ryan, and laughs at Toby's misery at the news.

Reception
In its original American broadcast on November 18, 2010, "WUPHF.com" was viewed by an estimated 7.28 million viewers and received a 3.8 rating/10% share among adults between the ages of 18 and 49, improving from the prior week's episode.

For his work on this episode, Aaron Shure was nominated for a Writers Guild of America Award for Episodic Comedy.

Notes

References

External links

 "WUPHF.com" at NBC.com
 

2010 American television episodes
The Office (American season 7) episodes
Television episodes about social media